Army Group Centre (G. A. C.) was a grouping of French field armies during World War I, which was created on June 22, 1915. The army group covered the Western Front roughly between Rheims and Verdun.

Composition

July 1, 1915 
from North to South :
 6th Army (général Pierre Joseph Dubois)
 5th Army (général Louis Franchet d'Espèrey)
 4th Army (général Fernand de Langle de Cary)

February 15, 1917 
From West to East :
 4th Army (général Pierre Roques)
 2nd Army (général Adolphe Guillaumat)

Commanders 
 Général Édouard de Castelnau (June 22, 1915 – December 12, 1915)
 Général Fernand de Langle de Cary (December 12, 1915 – May 2, 1916)
 Général Philippe Pétain (May 2, 1916 – May 4, 1917)
 Général Émile Fayolle  (May 4, 1917 – December 1, 1917)
 Général Paul Maistre (July 6, 1918 – December 1918)

Sources 
 The French Army and the First World War by Elizabeth Greenhalgh
 Philippe Pétain et Marc Ferro (Avant-propos), La Guerre mondiale : 1914–1918, Toulouse, Éditions Privat, 2014, 372 p. (OCLC 891408727)

Military units and formations of France in World War I
Military units and formations established in 1915
Army groups of France
Army groups of World War I